The 2014–15 Cal State Fullerton Titans men's basketball team represented California State University, Fullerton during the 2014–15 NCAA Division I men's basketball season. The Titans, led by second year head coach Dedrique Taylor, played their home games at Titan Gym as members of the Big West Conference. They finished the season 9–22, 1–15 in Big West play to finish in last place. They failed to qualify for the Big West tournament.

Roster

Schedule and results
Source: 

|-
!colspan=9 style="background:#F69F1E; color:#003768;"| Exhibition

|-
!colspan=9 style="background:#F69F1E; color:#003768;"| Non-conference games

|-
!colspan=9 style="background:#F69F1E; color:#003768;"| Conference games

References

Cal State Fullerton Titans men's basketball seasons
Cal State Fullerton
Fullerton Titans
Fullerton Titans